The 1959 Campeonato Nacional de Fútbol Profesional, was the 27th season of top-flight football in Chile. Universidad de Chile won their second title following a 2–1 win against Colo-Colo in the championship play-off on 11 November 1959, also qualifying to the 1960 Copa de Campeones.

League table

Results

Championship play-off

Topscorer

See also
1959 Copa Chile

References

External links
ANFP 
RSSSF Chile 1959

Primera División de Chile seasons
Chile
Primera